Dora van der Groen (10 March 1927 – 8 November 2015) was a Belgian actress and theatre director. 

She appeared in more than 120 films and television shows between 1945 and 2003. She played Vrouw Coene in Wij, Heren van Zichem and  starred in the 1975 film Dokter Pulder zaait papavers, which was entered into the 26th Berlin International Film Festival. She spent her later years in a nursing home, and died in 2015 at the age of 88.

Partial filmography

 Baas Ganzendonck (1945)
 Seagulls Die in the Harbour (1955) - Prostituée
 Vuur, liefde en vitaminen (1956) - Jessy Labroche
 Wat doen we met de liefde? (1957) - Lottie
 Het geluk komt morgen (1958) - Olga
 The Man Who Had His Hair Cut Short (1966) - Beata Tyszkiewicz (voice)
 Monsieur Hawarden (1968) - Mw. Deschamps
 The Deadly Trap (1971)
 Malpertuis (1971) - Sylvie Dideloo
 Ieder van ons (1971)
 Het dwaallicht (1973) - Mevrouw Laarmans
 Rolande met de bles (1973) - Coleta
 Camera sutra (of de bleekgezichten) (1973) - Moeder
 Dakota (1974) - Mary
 Kind van de zon (1975) - Mother
 Keetje Tippel (1975) - Moeder André (uncredited)
 Dokter Pulder zaait papavers (1975) - Mevrouw Mies
 The Arrival of Joachim Stiller (1976) - Madame Frans
 Rubens (1977) - Infante Isabella
 Het verleden (1982) - Mw. Van der Putte
 Alleen (1982) - Vrouw
 De vlaschaard (1983) - Barbele
 Jan zonder vrees (1984) - (voice)
 De aardwolf (1985) - Moeder van Nora
 L'été provisoire (1985) - La scénariste
 De vulgaire geschiedenis van Charelke Dop (1985) - Eufrazie
 Dagboek van een Oude Dwaas (1987) - Alma / Zuster-nurse
 Havinck (1987) - Moeder Lydia
 The Abyss (1988) - Greete
 Jan Rap en z'n maat (1989) - Dokter Jo
 Eline Vere (1991) - hospita
 Minder dood dan de anderen (1992) - Mother
 Antonia's Line (1995) - Allegonde
 Dandelion Game (1998) - Kerkkoorleidster
 S. (1998) - Grandmother
 Film 1 (1999) - Moeder Van Buren
 Mariken (2000) - Zwarte Weeuw
 Pauline and Paulette (2001) - Pauline Declercq
 Villa des Roses (2002) - Mrs. Gendron

References

External links

1927 births
2015 deaths
20th-century Belgian actresses
21st-century Belgian actresses
Belgian film actresses
Belgian television actresses
Belgian theatre directors
Actors from Antwerp